Euphemia of Sweden (Swedish: Eufemia Eriksdotter; 1317 – 16 June 1370) was a Swedish princess. She was Duchess consort of Mecklenburg, heiress of Sweden and of Norway, and mother of King Albert of Sweden. 
(c. 1338-1412) .

Biography

Early life
Euphemia was born in 1317 to Eric Magnusson (b. c. 1282-1318), Duke of Södermanland, second son of King Magnus I of Sweden, and Princess Ingeborg of Norway (1300–1360), the heiress and the only legitimate daughter of King Haakon V of Norway (1270– 1319).

In 1319, her infant elder brother Magnus VII of Norway (1316–1374) succeeded their maternal grandfather to the throne of Norway. That same year, Swedish nobles exiled their uncle, King Birger of Sweden, after which the infant Magnus was elected King of Sweden. Their mother Ingeborg had a seat in the guardian government as well as the position of an independent ruler of her own fiefs, and played an important part during their childhood and adolescence.

The 24 July 1321 marriage contract for Euphemia was signed at Bohus in her mother's fief in Bohuslän. Her mother had plans to take control over Danish Scania, next to her duchy. The marriage was arranged with the terms that Mecklenburg, Saxony, Holstein, Rendsburg and Schleswig would assist Ingeborg in the conquest of Scania. This was approved by the council of Norway but not Sweden. When Ingeborg's forces under command of Knut Porse of Varberg, invaded Scania in 1322–23, Mecklenburg betrayed her and the alliance was broken. Eventually, the affair of Euphemia's marriage led to a conflict between Ingeborg and the governments of Sweden and Norway, which led to the demise of Ingeborg's political position in the guardian governments. The marriage took place anyway, after a fifteen-year engagement. Euphemia did not lack influence in Sweden. She is known to have acted as the witness of seals in several documents. In 1335, when King Magnus appointed Nils Abjörnsson (Sparre av Tofta) to drots, the condition that Euphemia would act as his adviser was included in his appointment.

Duchess of Mecklenburg
Euphemia was married in Rostock on April 10, 1336, to her distant kinsman, Albert II, Duke of Mecklenburg (1318 – 2 February 1379), a North-German lord deeply interested in obtaining some power in Scandinavia. Later the same year, the couple returned to Sweden with Rudolf of Saxony and Henry of Holstein to be present at the coronation of her brother and sister-in-law Blanche of Namur. In Germany, Euphemia's life as a Duchess consort of Mecklenburg does not appear to have affected her status in Sweden, as she was still a political factor there and her name was still placed on various documents. She was the mistress of a very expensive ducal court. In 1340–41, she convinced Magnus to grant renewed trading privileges in Norway to the Hanseatic cities of Mecklenburg, Rostock and Wismar. On 15 April 1357, she granted her the estates Hammar and Farthses  to Skänninge Abbey following the deaths of her half-brothers Haakon and Canute in 1350. She was last confirmed alive 27 October 1363, when she gave up the ownership of her dower estate in Mecklenburg. Her death year is not known, but she is confirmed dead 16 June 1370, when her widower made a vicaria to her memory. Euphemia lived  to see her own second son depose her brother from the Swedish throne, and ascend as King Albert of Sweden in 1364.

Issue 
At the time of her death, she had five surviving children:

Henry III, Duke of Mecklenburg (c. 1337–1383); Married, firstly, Ingeborg of Denmark (1347–c. 1370), eldest daughter of sonless King Waldemar IV of Denmark. They had children: Albert (claimant to position of Hereditary Prince of Denmark), Euphemia, Mary, and Ingeborg. Henry III married, secondly, Matilda of Werle.
Albert III, Duke of Mecklenburg  (1340–1412), King of Sweden from 1364 to 1389. Married, firstly, in 1359, Richardis of Schwerin (died 1377); they had children: Eric I, Duke of Mecklenburg (Hereditary Prince of Sweden) and Richardis Catherine. Albert married, secondly, Agnes of Brunswick-Lüneburg (d. 1434).
Magnus I, Duke of Mecklenburg (d. 1385); married, in 1369, Elisabeth of Pomerania-Rügen. They had at least one son, John and possibly the daughter, Euphemia   
Ingeborg of Mecklenburg (d. c. 1395); she married, firstly, Louis VI the Roman, Duke of Bavaria (1330–1365);  Married  secondly, Henry II, Count of Holstein-Rendsburg (c. 1317–1384); had several children: Gerhard, Albert, Henry, and Sophia.
Anna of Mecklenburg (died 1415); married in 1362/6 Count Adolf of Holstein (died 1390).

Ancestry

References

Other sources

Eufemia Eriksdotter, urn:sbl:15533, Svenskt biografiskt lexikon (art av Allan Mohlin. Art. stilistiskt bearbetad av redaktionen.), hämtad 2013-10-24.
Åke Ohlmarks (1973) Alla Sveriges drottningar (Stockholm : Geber) 

1317 births
1370 deaths
Eufemia 1317
House of Bjelbo
Duchesses of Mecklenburg
14th-century Swedish women
14th-century German women